Rano Mese Shaiza (11 November 1928 – 1 April 2015) was an Indian politician and a member of the United Democratic Party. Shaiza was the only woman Member of India's Lower House from the state of Nagaland to date.

Early life and education
Shaiza was born to an Angami Naga family in Phek Town, Nagaland. Her father, Sevilie Iralu, was a doctor by profession. Her mother Vitulie-ü Iralu was the elder sister of the founder of the Naga separatist movement, Angami Zapu Phizo.

Shaiza studied science at Cotton College, Guwahati, and graduated from Saint Mary's College, Shillong.

Political life
Shaiza was a schoolteacher before she joined the Naga separatist movement. She was the first president of the Women's Federation which was part of Naga National Council, and the first women president of the  United Democratic Party. In the 1960s, during the early stages of the Naga  movement, she was imprisoned for nineteen months.

Shaiza contested her first general election in 1977 and defeated the sitting chief minister Hokishe Sema of the Indian National Congress, making her the first woman Member of India's Lower House from the state of Nagaland.

Shaiza played an important role in taking the Naga peace accord ahead. She brokered the meeting between her uncle Angami Zapu Phizo and the then Indian Prime Minister Morarji Desai. Shaiza was a staunch advocate of prohibition and founded the Naga Mothers' Association that worked towards tackling alcohol abuse in Nagaland, and was instrumental in passing the Nagaland Liquor Total Prohibition Act, 1989 on 29 March 1990.

Personal life
Shaiza married Lungshim Shaiza, with whom she had two daughters and three sons. Lungshim Shaiza was assassinated by the National Socialist Council of Nagaland on 27 January 1990.

References

External links
 Rano M. Shaiza

1928 births
2015 deaths
Women members of the Lok Sabha
Lok Sabha members from Nagaland
India MPs 1977–1979
20th-century Indian women
20th-century Indian people